Diego Alejandro Castillo (born October 28, 1997) is a Venezuelan professional baseball infielder for the Arizona Diamondbacks of Major League Baseball (MLB). He made his MLB debut in 2022 with the Pittsburgh Pirates.

Career

Pittsburgh Pirates
The New York Yankees signed Castillo as an international free agent in December 2014. On July 26, 2021, the Yankees traded Castillo along with Hoy Park to the Pittsburgh Pirates for Clay Holmes.

The Pirates added Castillo to their 40-man roster after the 2021 season. 

On April 4, 2022, it was announced that Castillo had made the Pirates’ Opening Day roster. On April 9, Castillo collected his first career hit, lacing a pinch-hit double off of St. Louis Cardinals reliever T. J. McFarland. He was designated for assignment on December 20, 2022.

Arizona Diamondbacks
On December 23, 2022, Castillo was traded to the Arizona Diamondbacks in exchange for pitcher Scott Randall.

References

External links

1997 births
Living people
Altoona Curve players
Cardenales de Lara players
Charleston RiverDogs players
Dominican Summer League Yankees players
Gulf Coast Yankees players
Indianapolis Indians players
Major League Baseball infielders
Major League Baseball players from Venezuela
Pittsburgh Pirates players
Somerset Patriots players
Sportspeople from Barquisimeto
Tampa Tarpons players
Venezuelan expatriate baseball players in the United States
Venezuelan expatriate baseball players in the Dominican Republic